Windass is an English surname. Notable people with the surname include: 

 Dean Windass,  football player
 Josh Windass, football player, son of Dean

Fictional
 A fictional family from Coronation Street, consisting of:
Anna Windass
Gary Windass
Faye Windass
Eddie Windass
Len Windass

Surnames of British Isles origin